Luis Fonseca (born 25 December 1949) is a Costa Rican weightlifter. He competed in the men's middleweight event at the 1968 Summer Olympics.

References

1949 births
Living people
Costa Rican male weightlifters
Olympic weightlifters of Costa Rica
Weightlifters at the 1968 Summer Olympics
Sportspeople from San José, Costa Rica
20th-century Costa Rican people